Ranoxyl may refer to:
 Amoxicillin or Ranoxyl, a moderate-spectrum antibiotic
 Ranitidine or Ranoxyl, a stomach acid production inhibitor